The Greene County Courthouse Square District is a historic district in Eutaw, Alabama.  It is centered on the old Old Greene County Courthouse and extends outward along U.S. Route 11 and Alabama State Route 7.  It features examples of Greek Revival and commercial architecture.  The district was added to the National Register of Historic Places on December 31, 1979.

References

National Register of Historic Places in Greene County, Alabama
Historic districts in Greene County, Alabama
Greek Revival architecture in Alabama
Historic districts on the National Register of Historic Places in Alabama
Courthouses on the National Register of Historic Places in Alabama